Wild Justice may refer to:

 Wild Justice (novel), a 1979 novel by Wilbur Smith
 Wild Justice (1994 film), a 1994 film based on the novel
 Wild Justice (1925 film)
 "Wild Justice" (The Adventures of Black Beauty), 1973
 Wild Justice (TV series), 2010–2013 reality television series
 "Wild Justice" (The Professionals), an episode of the television series